The 29th annual National Geographic Bee was held in Washington, D.C. It was sponsored by the National Geographic Society. The State Bees were held on March 31, 2017, where the 54 finalists were determined. The 2017 Champion, Pranay Varada, received a $50,000 college scholarship, a lifetime membership to the National Geographic Society, and an all-expenses-paid Lindblad expedition for two to the Galápagos Islands aboard the new National Geographic Endeavour ll.

2017 State Champions
On March 31, 2017, the National Geographic State Bees were held across the 50 states, Washington, D.C., the Atlantic Territories, the Pacific Territories, and the Department of Defense. Fifty-four State or Territory level Champions were determined.

Preliminary rounds
The Preliminary Competition was held on Monday, May 15, 2017. It consisted of two parts: a written part and an oral part worth 16 points total. In the written part, contestants were asked to write a sentence about why preserving oceans is important, identify places on a map that had been part of National Geographic's "pristine seas" project, and write an paragraph about which place needed to have steps taken for its preservation first: The Rio de la Plata estuary, the Sundarbans, or the Great Barrier Reef. It was graded out of six points total. The oral part consisted of ten rounds about world geography and National Geographic Explorers. All 54 State Champions participated, and after a tiebreaker ten finalists were determined: 
 Ahilan Eraniyan- from California
 Rohan Kanchana- from Delaware
 Max Garon- from District of Columbia
 Nicholas Monahan- from Idaho
 Lucas Eggers- from Minnesota
 Abhinav Govindaraju- from New Hampshire
 Veda Bhattaram- from New Jersey
 Pranay Varada- from Texas
 Anish Susarla- from Virginia
 Thomas Wright- from Wisconsin

Final rounds
The Final Competition was held on Wednesday, May 17, 2017. The top 10 Finalists out of the 54 State Champions participated. Humorist, journalist, and actor Mo Rocca moderated the Competition for the second year in a row. The Champion was Pranay Varada of Texas. Thomas Wright of Wisconsin came second, and Veda Bhattaram of New Jersey came third. The GeoChallenge for the top three was about a new home country for the Maldivian people if their country becomes flooded after sea level rises. The choices were Indonesia, Turkey, and the Solomon Islands, in order of best to worst answer. In fourth place was Nicholas Monahan from Idaho. The fifth place finisher was Anish Susarla of Virginia, and Lucas Eggers of Minnesota came in sixth. Tying for seventh place were Rohan Kanchana of Delaware, Ahilan Eraniyan of California, and Max Garon of D.C. They were tied with Lucas Eggers, but in the tiebreaker question, asking for the distance between Washington D.C. and London, they were eliminated after Eggers guessed closer to the correct answer than them and he moved on. In tenth place was Abhinav Govindaraju of New Hampshire. The first eliminations took place after round 5, a lightning round, where four left the competition. The next three eliminations were after round 9, another lightning round.

References

2017 in Washington, D.C.
2017 in education
May 2017 events in the United States
National Geographic Bee